The 2016–17 Colorado State Rams women's basketball team represented Colorado State University in the 2016–17 NCAA Division I women's basketball season. The Rams, led by fifth year head coach Ryun Williams, played their home games at Moby Arena and were members of the Mountain West Conference. They finished the season 25–9, 15–3 in Mountain West play to win the regular season championship. They advanced to the semifinals of the Mountain West Conference women's basketball tournament where they lost to Boise State. They received an automatic bid to the Women's National Invitation Tournament where they defeated Saint Mary's in the first round before losing to UC Davis in the second round.

Roster

Schedule

|-
!colspan=9 style="background:#00674E; color:#FFC44F;"| Exhibition

|-
!colspan=9 style="background:#00674E; color:#FFC44F;"| Non-conference regular season

|-
!colspan=9 style="background:#00674E; color:#FFC44F;"| Mountain West regular season

|-
!colspan=9 style="background:#00674E;"| Mountain West Women's Tournament

|-

|-
!colspan=9 style="background:#00674E;"| Women's National Invitation Tournament

Rankings
2016–17 NCAA Division I women's basketball rankings

See also
 2016–17 Colorado State Rams men's basketball team

References

Colorado State
Colorado State Rams women's basketball seasons
Colorado State Rams
Colorado State Rams
2017 Women's National Invitation Tournament participants